Thomas Mayne (25 December 1901 – 25 January 1995) was an Australian industrial chemist. He was also a food researcher and the inventor of Milo, the powdered chocolate-malt drink. In 1934, Mayne developed Milo and launched it at the Sydney Royal Easter Show. Milo began production at the plant located in Smithtown, New South Wales. 

The name was derived from the famous ancient athlete Milo of Croton, after his legendary strength. Mayne himself enjoyed a hot cup of Milo every night till his death at age 93.

Mayne was an alumnus of Trinity Grammar School, Kew, Melbourne.

References

Time Magazine obituary for Thomas Mayne

20th-century Australian inventors
Australian chemists
People educated at Trinity Grammar School, Kew
1901 births
1995 deaths
People from Bendigo